Ronald J. Pestritto is an American academic. He is the Graduate Dean and Professor of Politics at Hillsdale College, and the author of two books and the editor of five more.

Early life
Ronald J. Pestritto graduated from Claremont McKenna College with a bachelor of arts degree in government in 1990. He earned a PhD in Political Science from the Claremont Graduate University in 1996.

Career
Pestritto was an assistant professor at Saint Vincent College from 1997 to 1999. He taught at the University of Dallas from 1999 to 2006, where he became a tenured associate professor in 2002. He joined Hillsdale College in 2006, and became a full professor in 2012. He has been the dean of the Graduate School since 2010, and he is also the Charles and Lucia Shipley chair in the American Constitution. Additionally, he is affiliated with the Claremont Institute, and he has published articles in its Claremont Review of Books.

Pestritto is the author of two books. His first book, Founding the Criminal Law: Punishment and Political Thought in the Origins of America, "is about penal reform and the philosophy of punishment as both were debated in postrevolutionary America." In a review for the American Political Science Review, Amy Bunger of Florida State University praised the book for its contextualization of ideas, and added that it could do with more historical examples and policy implementations on a state level. Reviewing it for The Annals of the American Academy of Political and Social Science, Jeffrey Reiman of American University was more critical, dismissing Pestritto's conclusion based on the work of Ramsey Clark and Karl Menninger as "out of date" by three decades. His second book, Woodrow Wilson and the Roots of Modern Liberalism, influenced television personality Glenn Beck.

Pestritto is also the editor of five books, three of which he co-edited with Thomas G. West, one of his colleagues at Hillsdale College.

Pestritto supported Donald J. Trump during the 2016 presidential election.

Selected works

As an author

As an editor

References

External links
Ronald J. Pestritto on C-SPAN

Living people
Claremont McKenna College alumni
Claremont Graduate University alumni
Saint Vincent College faculty
University of Dallas faculty
Hillsdale College faculty
American university and college faculty deans
Year of birth missing (living people)